The following is a list of notable people who converted to paganism from a different religion or no religion. This article addresses only past voluntary professions of faith by the individuals listed, and is not intended to address ethnic, cultural, or other considerations. Certain people listed here may be lapsed or former converts, or their current religious identity may be ambiguous, uncertain or disputed. Such cases are noted in their list entries.

List of notable converts to paganism

From Atheism/Agnostism

Agnostic
 Dylan Sprouse

From Christianity
 Julian the Apostate

Eastern/Oriential Orthodoxy
 Gemistus Pletho
 Gleb Botkin (From Russian Orthodoxy)

Protestantism
 Janet Farrar (From Anglicanism)
 Adefunmi (From Baptist)
 Gustav Frenssen 
 Heinrich Himmler 
 Morning Glory Zell-Ravenheart
 Mary Ellen Tracy (From Mormonism/Latter Day Saints)
 Yang Chuan-kwang

Roman Catholicism
 Dan Halloran 
 Maxine Sanders
 Robert Anton Wilson
 Isaac Bonewits

Nontrinitarian/Restoration
 Mary Ellen Tracy (From Mormonism/Latter Day Saints)

New Christian Movements
 Stewart Farrar (From Christian Science)

From Judaism
 Margot Adler

From Samaritanism
 Marinus of Neapolis

See also
 List of people by belief
 List of Catholic converts
 List of converts to Hinduism
 List of converts to Islam
 List of converts to Buddhism
 List of converts to Judaism
 List of converts to Sikhism
 List of former Christians
 List of former Muslims

References

Paganism